"Break Up in a Small Town" is a song co-written and recorded by American country music singer Sam Hunt. It was released to country radio, by MCA Nashville on September 21, 2015 as the fourth single from his debut studio album Montevallo (2014). The song was written by Hunt, Zach Crowell and Shane McAnally.

Background and composition
The song has country and R&B influence, which Hunt expressed in an article with Billboard. Shane McAnally said of the influence: "It's a model that I think many people could learn from because you are still evolving as an artist along the way. Just because you put music out, it doesn't mean that is where you stop for the next year." Hunt then discussed the process of making the song, saying it was born when he was "singing that chorus melody late one night while riding around trying to come up with song ideas." He originally "didn't want to write anymore break up songs," but the melody of the song changed his mind, saying it "fit too perfectly not to go with it."  The song was inspired by his breakup with his then-girlfriend Hannah Lee Fowler whom he has since married.

Critical reception
Billy Dukes of Taste of Country gave the song a favorable review and observed the song as "likely the wordiest song of 2015" and Hunt's "most genre-bending release to country radio", adding "Any talk of which genre Hunt belongs in misses the point. His story hits hard. It's deep and emotional and sincere and all the things we expect from a great country song."

Music video
The music video was directed by Tim Mattia and premiered in October 2015. The video was shot in Macon County, Tennessee.

Commercial performance
The song debuted on the Hot Country Songs chart at number 30 for the week of August 30, 2014, the week his EP X2C was released, with 24,000 copies sold. All four songs from the EP debuted on the chart, with "Ex to See", "House Party", and "Break Up in a Small Town" doing so exclusively through digital sales. It also debuted at number 16 on the Country Digital Songs chart. Following its release as a single from Montevallo, the song peaked at number two on the Hot Country Songs chart, but was kept out of the top spot by "Die a Happy Man" performed by Thomas Rhett. The song became Hunt's fourth consecutive top-three hit on the Hot Country Songs chart. The song was certified Gold by the RIAA on September 3, 2015, and Platinum on December 17, 2015. As of March 2016, the song has sold nearly 1,230,000 downloads.

Charts

Weekly charts

Year-end charts

Certifications and sales

References

2015 singles
Country ballads
2010s ballads
MCA Nashville Records singles
Sam Hunt songs
Songs written by Sam Hunt
Songs written by Shane McAnally
Songs written by Zach Crowell
2014 songs
Song recordings produced by Shane McAnally